Evermist was a fanzine that began publication in 1974.

Publication history
Evermist was a chapbook-sized fanzine that featured poetry and short stories with a fantasy theme, as well as reviews and letters. It was published by David Warren of Labelle, Florida from Spring 1975 to Summer 1978.

Volume 3, No. 1 (Winter 1976) was a special Tolkien edition; a copy has been added to the Sumner Gary Hunnewell Collection of Tolkien-related fanzines at Marquette University.

Reception
In Issue #6 of The Strategic Review, Gary Gygax noted that some of the published poetry was "excellent", and thought that the reproduction was "good to fair." On a scale of Major Tragedy to Major Triumph, Gygax rated the fanzine a Minor Triumph.

References

Defunct literary magazines published in the United States
Fanzines
Magazines established in 1974
Magazines published in Florida
Magazines with year of disestablishment missing